Melis van de Groep  (born 4 March 1958 in Bunschoten) is a Dutch politician of the Reformed Political League (GPV) and his successor the ChristianUnion (ChristenUnie). Since 2006 he has been Mayor of Bunschoten.

Van de Groep was a municipal councillor as well as an alderman of Bunschoten, and a member of the provincial parliament of Utrecht between 2001 and 2007.

He belongs to the Reformed Churches in the Netherlands (Liberated).

References 
  www.burgemeesterbunschoten.nl

1958 births
Living people
21st-century Dutch politicians
Aldermen in Utrecht (province)
Christian Union (Netherlands) politicians
Dutch civil servants
Mayors in Utrecht (province)
Members of the Provincial Council of Utrecht
People from Bunschoten
Reformed Churches (Liberated) Christians from the Netherlands
Reformed Political League politicians